The Regional Industrial Development Corporation of Southwestern Pennsylvania--known colloquially as the RIDC--is a privately funded non-profit serving the Pittsburgh metropolitan area to focus on a regional approach to economic development primarily through managing and rehabilitating area research and business parks for modern tenants.  The RIDC was formed on August 8, 1955 as a non-profit corporation after area business, corporate, government and labor leaders supported a central agency responsible for developing and coordinating efforts to create new employment and economic diversity.
As of March 2013 it is listed as the third largest commercial property manager in metropolitan Pittsburgh with 7,400,000 gross leasable square feet, behind only Oxford Development and CBRE Group while surpassing Jones Lang LaSalle.

Research Parks

RIDC provides development, finance and leasing of new and redeveloped research and business parks using a wide range of real estate development activities.  RIDC Research and Business parks are both new development and lab or industrial transfers from such corporations as Sony, Westinghouse and US Steel and include:  

Bakery Square (2007 site preparation) 
Beaver Manor (since 1987)
City Center of Duquesne
Collaborative Innovation Center	 
Glassport (historical involvement circa 1978)
Industrial Center of McKeesport (since 1984) 	
Innovation Ridge
Keystone Commons (since 1893, RIDC since 1987)
Lawrenceville Technology Park	
Mill 19 at Hazelwood Green
Neshannock
Park Lane (1988 site preparation)
Park O'Hara (Giant Eagle headquarters)
Park West (original home to USAirways Ops Center)	
Pittsburgh Technology Center (48 acres since 1984)	 
Westmoreland
Southpointe (historical involvement, 589 acres)	
Thorn Hill (900 acres started December 11, 1968)
Tech 21 

Non-RIDC Research and Business parks in the Pittsburgh area also include:

University of Pittsburgh Applied Research Center
George Westinghouse Research Park

Mission
RIDC's mission is to foster and support economic growth with job creation through real estate development to advance the public interest within metropolitan Pittsburgh.  Relying on public, private, and institutional partnerships, RIDC has assisted both emerging and existing growth opportunities across industry sectors. A regional economic development directed towards manufacturing, assembly, distribution, and research and development activities focuses RIDC with entrepreneurs and businesses located both within and outside the region.

Community support
With a long history of both state and regional economic research
RIDC staffs professionals in financial and property management specialties, planning, engineering, construction, site selection, facility design, construction management with regular study groups that include community leaders, corporate CEOs and Chairman.
The RIDC provides comprehensive and coordinated development or redevelopment of property projects from conceptual design to completion and occupancy as well as business incubators.
Varied industry needs, including machinery and equipment financing assistance are serviced by the RIDC for new, small and growing business enterprises, applied research and development activities and partnership with Western Pennsylvania's academic institutions.  Historically the RIDC has hosted Pittsburgh Hilton conferences with area business leaders, Chambers of Commerce and speeches from the State Secretary of Commerce.  It has partnered with the Appalachian Regional Commission, Carnegie Mellon University the Heinz Endowments and the Richard King Mellon Foundation among others. It has provided board members for the Allegheny County Planning Commission for such projects as Oxford Centre.

In the early 1990s the RIDC was criticized for not being more representative with female and minority board members as well as a pattern of using urban funds and assets to market suburban developments.  The criticism resulted in Pennsylvania state legislature hearings.

History
In early 1955 Pittsburgh business, corporate, government and labor leaders supported a central agency responsible for developing and coordinating efforts to create new employment and economic diversity.  The RIDC was established August 8, 1955 as a nonprofit corporation and amended its charter on February 16, 1962 to allow it to engage directly in such things as construction, purchasing, selling and financing of developments. In October, 1967 the RIDC took the first steps on being inter-county when it became the lead organization in a 9 county partnership.

Operational goals of the RIDC are to maintain a dynamic economic development portfolio through preserving, strengthening and expanding the area's employment base through retention and expansion of job opportunities, and by developing and promoting programs that assist in the creation of a more diversified economy.

Presidents
John P. Robin 1955-1967
Hiram Milton 1967-1981  
Frank Brooks Robinson 1981-2003
Robert C. Stephenson 2003-2009
Dr. Donald F. Smith Jr. 2009–Present

Foreign Trade Zones
The Pittsburgh area boasts two of the state's seven Foreign Trade Zones with the RIDC managing Foreign Trade Zone #33 at the following locations:

RIDC Park West
Pittsburgh International Airport (Involvement since 1987)
Leetsdale Industrial Park
Westmoreland Business Park
Millennium Business Park
City Center of Duquesne
Industrial Center of McKeesport
Thorn Hill Industrial Park
Lawrenceville Technology Center
RIDC Industrial Park
RIDC Westmoreland (since 2012)
Keystone Commons
South Hills Industrial Park
Findlay Industrial Park
Hopewell Business Park
Westgate Business Park
Aliquippa Industrial Park
Ambridge Regional Center

Foreign Trade Zone #33 Subzones:
33 D Mitsubishi Power Electrics
Site 1: 510 Keystone Drive, Warrendale
Site 2: 530 Keystone Drive, Warrendale
Site 4: 2905 Maryland Ave, North Versailles
Site 5: 2526 Lovi Road, Economy
33 E DNP IMS America Corporation

See also
Greater Pittsburgh Chamber of Commerce
Allegheny Regional Asset District
Economic Club of Pittsburgh

References

External links
RIDC homepage
1981 Pittsburgh Post Gazette feature

Non-profit organizations based in Pennsylvania
Organizations established in 1955
1955 establishments in Pennsylvania